Goran Kasum (born June 22, 1966, in Bitola, Macedonia) is a former Serbian Greco-Roman Wrestler who competed in the 1988, 1992 and 1996 Summer Olympics. He won bronze medals in the 1990 and 1991 World Wrestling Championships in the Men's 82 kg Greco-Roman Division.

References

External links
 

1966 births
Living people
Serbian male sport wrestlers
People from Bitola
Olympic wrestlers of Yugoslavia
Olympic wrestlers as Independent Olympic Participants
Wrestlers at the 1988 Summer Olympics
Wrestlers at the 1992 Summer Olympics
Wrestlers at the 1996 Summer Olympics
Yugoslav male sport wrestlers
World Wrestling Championships medalists
Mediterranean Games gold medalists for Yugoslavia
Competitors at the 1991 Mediterranean Games
Mediterranean Games medalists in wrestling
European Wrestling Championships medalists